Denzler is a surname. Notable people with the surname include:

Andy Denzler (born 1965), Swiss artist
Cynthia Denzler (born 1983), Colombian/American/Swiss alpine skier
Ferdinand Denzler (1909–1991), Swiss water polo player
Günther Denzler (born 1948), German politician
Robert F. Denzler, Swiss composer and conductor